Boualem Bel Alouane (born 13 March 1961) is an Algerian boxer. He competed in the men's light welterweight event at the 1980 Summer Olympics. At the 1980 Summer Olympics, he defeated Barrington Cambridge of Guyana, before losing to Ace Rusevski of Yugoslavia.

References

External links
 

1961 births
Living people
Algerian male boxers
Olympic boxers of Algeria
Boxers at the 1980 Summer Olympics
Place of birth missing (living people)
Light-welterweight boxers
21st-century Algerian people
20th-century Algerian people